SDE can stand for:

In culture 
 Self Defined Ethnicity, an ethnic classification code used by the British government and police

In science, medicine, and technology 
 Screen door effect, a video display issue
 Sebacoyl dinalbuphine ester, an analgesic
 Semantic dictionary encoding
 Software development engineer
 Software development environment
 Spatial Database Engine (ArcSDE)
Spectral density estimation
 Stochastic differential equation
sub-divisional error, a read head error mechanism
 System development environment

In education 
 Self-directed education, self-learning, often synonymous with unschooling

In sports 
 Strong-side Defensive End, a position in American Football

In politics 
 Social Democratic Party (Estonia)
 State delegate equivalents, a part of the

In transportation 
 The IATA code for an airport in Argentina, Vicecomodoro Ángel de la Paz Aragonés Airport
 The National Rail station code for a railway station in London, England, Shadwell railway station
 An expressway in Johor, Malaysia, Senai–Desaru Expressway